You Treated Me Wrong is a 1980 Wizex studio album. The album peaked upon the 27th position on the Swedish albums chart.

Track listing

Side 1

Side 2

Charts

References 

1980 albums
Wizex albums